Elections are held in Tel Aviv to elect the city's mayor. Currently, such elections are regularly scheduled to elect mayors to five-year terms.

Prior to 1978, mayors were selected by a vote of the city council. Since 1978, direct elections have been held for mayor.

1978
The 1978 Tel Aviv mayoral election was held on 8, November 1978, and saw the reelection of Shlomo Lahat.

1983 
The 1983 Tel Aviv mayoral election saw the reelection of Shlomo Lahat to a third consecutive term.

1989
The 1989 Tel Aviv mayoral election was held on 28 February 1989, and saw the reelection of Shlomo Lahat to a fourth consecutive term.

1993
The 1993 Tel Aviv mayoral election was held on 2 November 1993, and saw the election of Roni Milo.

1998
The 1998 Tel Aviv mayoral election was held on 10 November 1998, and saw the election of Ron Huldai.

Incumbent mayor Roni Milo had opted against seeking reelection, instead planning to run for prime minister in 2000 as the head of a new centrist political party.

Huldai had been the principal of Herzliya Hebrew Gymnasium. Huldai ran as an independent candidate with the support of the Israeli Labor Party. Huldai was regarded to be a political liberal. His opponents included former general Doron Rubin and actor Samuel Vilozny.

Huldai was considered the front-runner during the campaign.

The campaign of Doron Rubin never received much momentum.

There were instances of electoral violence during the campaign. Instances included a switchboard serving Huldai's campaign office was set on fire, a firebomb being tossed at one of the mayoral candidates homes, and a car belonging to a volunteer for one of the campaigns being set on fire.

Huldai's victory was regarded to be a landslide.

2003
The 2003 Tel Aviv mayoral election was held on 28 October 2003, and saw the reelection of Ron Huldai. Huldai won 55,966 votes (62.91% of the vote) against 5 opponents.

2008
The 2008 Tel Aviv mayoral election was held on 11 November 2008, and saw the reelection of Ron Huldai to a third consecutive term. Huldai won 51% of the vote.

Candidates
Ron Huldai, incumbent mayor since 1998
Dov Khenin (City for All), member of the Knesset
Oren Shahor, retired general
Pe'er Visner, chair of The Greens and 2003 mayoral candidate
Asma Agbaria Zahalka

Campaigning
Huldai was considered the election's front-runner. However, he faced criticisms accusing him of failing to address the demand for affordable housing in the city. and alleging that development in the city during his mayoralty had been beneficial only to the city's wealthy.

Runner-up Dov Khenin, a member of the Knesset who ran on a social and environmental issues-focused platform, won 34% of the vote. Kkhenin, running under the "City for All" party label, was also affiliated with Hadash.

One of the top issues discussed during the election included growing demand for parking spaces in the city, which outweighed the supply.

Results

2013

The 2013 Tel Aviv mayoral election was held 22 October 2013, and saw the reelection of Ron Huldai to a fourth consecutive term.

2018

The 2018 Tel Aviv mayoral election was held on 30 October 2018 to elect the mayor of Tel Aviv. It saw the reelection of Ron Huldai to a fifth consecutive term.

The election was part of the 2018 Israeli municipal elections.

Candidates
Natan Elnatan (Shas), deputy mayor
Assaf Harel (We Are the City), comedian
Ron Huldai (One Tel Aviv), incumbent mayor since 1998
Asaf Zamir (City Majority), deputy mayor and founder and chairman of "City Majority"

Results
Since Huldai's share of the vote exceeded the 40% threshold required to avert a runoff election, no runoff was held.

Turnout was 44.17%

2023
The 2023 Tel Aviv mayoral election will be held to elect the mayor of Tel Aviv. While current Israeli law imposes no term limits on Mayors, Incumbent Ron Huldai, who has announced his intention to run for a sixth term, could potentially be term limited if a law restricting mayors to two terms enters into effect before the election.

References